The 2000 United States presidential election in New York took place on November 7, 2000, as part of the 2000 United States presidential election. Voters chose 33 representatives, or electors to the Electoral College, who voted for president and vice president.

New York was won by Incumbent Democratic Vice President Al Gore in a landslide victory; Gore received 60.22% of the vote to Republican George W. Bush's 35.22%, a Democratic victory margin of 25.00%. This marked the first time since 1964 that a Democratic presidential candidate won more than 60% of the vote in New York State, and only the second time in history, solidifying New York's status as a solid blue state in the 21st century. New York weighed in as about 25% more Democratic than the national average in the 2000 election.

The key to Gore's victory was wide margins of victory in greater New York City and Long Island. He did win some counties in upstate New York, but won with small margins, except for Albany County, which voted almost exactly the same as the statewide results. Since third-party candidates received over 4% of the vote, Bush did very poorly, although he won a majority of the counties in upstate New York, including his largest victory in small and rural Hamilton County. , this is the last election in which the Democratic candidate won Montgomery County.

Bush became the first Republican to win the White House without carrying Onondaga, Cayuga, St. Lawrence, Broome, or Nassau Counties since these counties' founding in 1794, 1799, 1802, 1806, and 1899, respectively, the first to do so without carrying Clinton, Franklin, or Richmond Counties since Herbert Hoover in 1928, the first to do so without carrying Rockland, Seneca or Westchester Counties since Benjamin Harrison in 1888, the first to do so without carrying Sullivan County since James A. Garfield in 1880, and the first to do so without carrying Columbia, Rensselear, Suffolk, or Ulster Counties since Rutherford Hayes in 1876.

Primaries

Democratic primary
The Democrats held their primary on March 7. There were 294 delegates at stake, with 243 pledged and 51 unpledged. Vice President Al Gore won 158 pledged and the support of 44 unpledged while U.S. Senator Bill Bradley won 85 pledged and the support of 1 unpledged.

Polling

Republican primary
The Republican primary was held on March 7. There were 101 delegates at stake, with 93 district delegates being decided in the primary and 8 statewide delegates being decided at the state committee meeting in May. Texas Governor George W. Bush won 67 district delegates while U.S. Senator John McCain won 26 district delegates. The 8 statewide delegates were unbound.

Polling

General election

Polling

Results

(a) John Hagelin was then nominee of the Natural Law Party nationally.

By congressional district
Gore won 27 of 31 congressional districts, including 8 that were won by a Republican: the 1st, 3rd, 13th, 19th, 20th, 24th, 25th, and 30th congressional districts, respectively.

By county

Counties that flipped from Democratic to Republican
Cattaraugus (Largest city: Olean)
Chautauqua (Largest city: Jamestown)
Chemung (Largest city: Elmira)
Chenango (Largest city: Norwich)
Cortland (Largest city: Cortland)
Delaware (Largest city: Sidney)
Dutchess (Largest city: Poughkeepsie)
Essex (Largest CDP: Ticonderoga)
Fulton (Largest city: Gloversville)
Herkimer (Largest city: German Flatts)
Jefferson (Largest city: Le Ray)
Lewis (Largest city: Lowville)
Madison (Largest city: Oneida)
Oneida (Largest city: Utica)
Ontario (Largest city: Geneva)
Orange (Largest city: Palm Tree)
Oswego (Largest city: Oswego)
Otsego (Largest city: Oneonta)
Saratoga (Largest city: Saratoga Springs)
Schoharie (Largest city: Cobleskill)
Schuyler (Largest city: Watkins Glen)
Warren (Largest city: Glens Falls)
Washington (Largest city: Hudson Falls)
Yates (Largest city: Penn Yan)

Geographic Breakdown
Al Gore won an overwhelming landslide in fiercely Democratic New York City, taking 1,703,364 votes to George W. Bush's 398,726, a 77.90% - 18.23% victory. Gore carried all 5 boroughs of New York City. Excluding New York City's votes, Gore still would have carried New York State, but by a smaller margin, receiving 2,404,543 votes to Bush's 2,004,648, giving Gore a 54.53% - 45.47% win.

Electors

Technically the voters of New York cast their ballots for electors: representatives to the Electoral College. New York is allocated 33 electors because it has 31 congressional districts and 2 senators. All candidates who appear on the ballot or qualify to receive write-in votes must submit a list of 33 electors, who pledge to vote for their candidate and his or her running mate. Whoever wins the majority of votes in the state is awarded all 33 electoral votes. Their chosen electors then vote for president and vice president. Although electors are pledged to their candidate and running mate, they are not obligated to vote for them. An elector who votes for someone other than his or her candidate is known as a faithless elector.

The electors of each state and the District of Columbia met on December 18, 2000 to cast their votes for president and vice president. The Electoral College itself never meets as one body. Instead the electors from each state and the District of Columbia met in their respective capitols.

The following were the members of the Electoral College from the state. All were pledged to and voted for Gore and Lieberman:
Susan I. Abramowitz
Leslie Alpert
Martin S. Begun
David L. Cohen
Carolee A. Conklin
Martin Connor
Lorraine Cortez Vasquez
Inez E. Dickens
Cynthia Emmer
Herman D. Farrell Jr.
Emily Giske
Patrick G. Halpin
Raymond B. Harding
Judith Hope
Denis M. Hughes
Virginia Kee
Bertha Lewis
Alberta Madonna
Thomas J. Manton
Deborah Marciano
Helen Marshall
Carl McCall
Elizabeth F. Momrow
Clarence Norman Jr.
Daniel F. Donohue
Shirley O'Connell
G. Steven Pigeon
Roberto Ramirez
Michael Schell
Sheldon Silver
Andrew Spano
Eliot Spitzer
Randi Weingarten

See also
 United States presidential elections in New York
 Presidency of George W. Bush

References

New York
2000
United States president